Chipinge Central is a constituency of the National Assembly of the Parliament of Zimbabwe located in Manicaland Province. Its current MP since the 2018 election is Raymore Machingura of ZANU–PF.

Electoral history 
In the 2008 parliamentary election the seat was won by the ZANU-PF candidate Chitima Alice Mwaemura defeating the MDC candidate from the Morgan Tsvangirai faction, Sithole Samson.

References

External links
https://web.archive.org/web/20080401052750/http://www.sokwanele.com/thisiszimbabwe/archives/796
https://web.archive.org/web/20080303001109/http://www.newzimbabwe.com/pages/electoral159.17766.html

Manicaland Province
Parliamentary constituencies in Zimbabwe